Badhamiopsis is a genus of fungi belonging to the family Physaraceae.

The species of this genus are found in Europe and America.

Species:

Badhamiopsis ainoae 
Badhamiopsis cavifera 
Badhamiopsis nucleata

References

Myxogastria
Amoebozoa genera